Andi Kovel (born April 29, 1969, in Rochester New York) is an American designer, installation artist and glass artist best known for her appearance on the Netflix original series Blown Away Season 2. She is also known for her ADX Award nominated home accessories brand Esque Studio.  for helping redefine hand-blown glass as high design and functional art.

Education 
In 1991, Kovel graduated from The University of Colorado with a BFA in sculpture and continued with a degree in art education and theory from The School of Visual Arts and New York University in 1997.

Career 
In 2021 Kovel was one of 10 contestants in the second season of the Netflix original series Blown Away.

Her original glass works are in the permanent collection of the Tacoma Museum of Glass, Cooper Hewitt Museum of Design, and the Shanghai Museum of Glass

In 2018, she & Esque Studio partner, Justin Parker, won best lighting design of the year from NYCXDESIGN and Interior Design Magazine in collaboration with Harry Allen Design

References

External links 
 Official website for Esque Studio
 Official website for Andi Kovel
 Andi Kovel on IMDb

1969 births
Living people
20th-century American women artists
21st-century American women artists
People from Rochester, New York
Women glass artists
American designers
University of Colorado alumni 
School of Visual Arts alumni 
New York University alumni
American glass artists